Little Lehigh Creek is approximately  long and is located in the Lehigh Valley region of eastern Pennsylvania. It is sometimes referred to as the Little Lehigh River. It is the largest tributary of the Lehigh River.

The creek flows in a winding course through the Lehigh Valley. It originates in Longswamp Township in Berks County and flows generally northeast through Lower Macungie Township and Salisbury Township. In the city of Allentown, it receives Jordan Creek, just before flowing into the Lehigh River.

Recreation
The Little Lehigh forms a linear park in Allentown and Emmaus. This park has a covered bridge and walking trails along the creek. In spite of a trout hatchery in the park, the stream is known for its population of wild brown trout. Sections of the stream are designated for catch and release fly fishing only. There are extensive equestrian trails running along the stream through the park used by riders, runners and walkers.

Tributaries
Cedar Creek
Jordan Creek
Switzer Creek
Mill Creek (Jordan Creek)
Hegel's Run
Schantz Valley Creek
Elk Ridge Run
Macintosh Run
Thicket Run
Haasadahl Creek
Leibert Creek
Spring Creek
Swabia Creek (also called Swope Creek)

See also
List of rivers of Pennsylvania
Trexler Nature Preserve

External links

U.S. Geological Survey: PA stream gaging stations

Geography of Allentown, Pennsylvania
Rivers of Pennsylvania
Rivers of Berks County, Pennsylvania
Rivers of Lehigh County, Pennsylvania
Tributaries of the Lehigh River